Naiguatá is a city located in Vargas, Venezuela. It is part of the Litoral Varguense conurbation.

References

Cities in Vargas (state)